The 2005–06 Iranian Futsal Super League will be the 3rd season of the Futsal Super League.

League standings

Results table

Awards 

 Winner: Shensa
 Runners-up: Tam Iran Khodro
 Third-Place: Rah Ahan
 Top scorer:  Vahid Shamsaei (Tam Iran Khodro) (55)

References

Futsal Planet 
Futsal News 

Iranian Futsal Super League seasons
1